Todd Mitchell Palin (born September 6, 1964) is an American oil field production operator and commercial fisherman who was the first gentleman of Alaska from 2006 to 2009. He is the former husband of former Alaska governor Sarah Palin, the 2008 Republican vice presidential nominee with John McCain.

Early life and education
Palin was born and raised in Dillingham, Alaska to James F. "Jim" and Blanche Palin (née Roberts). Palin has Yup'ik (from a great-grandmother), Dutch, and English ancestry.

In 1982, Palin graduated from Wasilla High School, which is the same alma mater of his wife and their eldest two children, son Track and daughter Bristol. He has taken some college courses but did not complete a degree.

Career
Palin was a union member and belonged to the United Steelworkers union.

For eighteen years, he worked for BP in the North Slope oil fields of Alaska. In 2007, in order to avoid a conflict of interest that related to his wife's position as governor, he took a leave from his job as production supervisor, when his employer became involved in natural gas pipeline negotiations with his wife's administration. Seven months later, because the family needed more income, Todd returned to BP. In order to avoid potential conflict of interest, this time, he accepted a non-management position as a production operator. He resigned from his job on September 18, 2009, with the stated reason as a desire to spend more time with his family.

He is also a commercial salmon fisherman at Bristol Bay on the Nushugak River.

Public life

Voter registration
Palin first registered to vote in 1989. From October 1995 through July 2002, except for a few months in 2000, he was registered to vote as a member of the Alaskan Independence Party. In late August 2008, The Politico reported that Palin was registered to vote as an independent (undeclared), and had never registered as a Republican. His wife, Sarah, confirmed that he is not registered with any party both in her 2009 memoir, Going Rogue: An American Life, and in a Q&A session following a 2010 address to a national convention of the Tea Party in Nashville, Tennessee.

First gentleman of Alaska
Palin was the first gentleman, or "first dude," as he was often nicknamed, for two and a half years, from 2006 to 2009. Early on in that role, he encouraged young Alaskans who could not afford college to consider jobs in the oil and gas industry as an effective training ground, and advised the governor on workforce development issues for the natural gas pipeline she supported.

In February 2010, the state of Alaska released to msnbc.com reporter Bill Dedman about 1,200 e-mails, which totaled 3,000 pages, that Palin exchanged with state officials. Almost 250 additional ones were withheld by the state, under a claim that executive privilege extends to Palin as an unpaid adviser to the government. Gregg Erickson, columnist for the Anchorage Daily News, said, in September 2008, that Palin "obviously plays an important role ... I've seen him in the governor's office and I know that she's conducted interviews in the governor's office with him present". The emails showed Palin discussing a wide range of activities: potential board appointees, constituent complaints, use of the state jet, oil and gas production, marine regulation, gas pipeline bids, wildfires, native Alaskan issues, the state effort to save the Matanuska Maid dairy, budget planning, potential budget vetoes, oil shale leasing, "strategy for responding to media allegations," staffing at the mansion, per diem payments to the governor for travel, "strategy for responding to questions about pregnancy," potential cuts to the governor's staff, "confidentiality issues," Bureau of Land Management land transfers and trespass issues and requests to the U.S. transportation secretary.

Other
As of late 2009, Palin was a community volunteer who worked in youth sports, coaching hockey and basketball.
He was a judge in the 2008 Miss Alaska pageant.

In August 2012, Palin became a contestant on the NBC celebrity reality competition series Stars Earn Stripes.

Thoroughbred racehorse First Dude, named after Palin's nickname, finished second at the 2010 Preakness Stakes and won the 2011 Hollywood Gold Cup.

Champion snowmachine racer
Palin is a four-time champion of the Tesoro Iron Dog, the world's longest snowmachine race, which traces the path of the Iditarod race with an extra journey of several hundred miles to Fairbanks added.

Palin has competed in the Tesoro every year since 1993. His racing teammate is Scott Davis, with whom he won in 2007. He has previously raced with Dusty Van Meter in the race, and they were co-champions in 2000 and 2002. In 1995, Palin partnered with Dwayne Drake for his first win.

In 2008,  from defending his Tesoro Iron Dog championship, he was injured and broke his arm when he was thrown 70 feet from his machine. He was sent to the hospital but managed to finish in fourth place.

In 2016, trying for another Tesoro Iron Dog championship, he was forced to scratch at checkpoint Nenana, 112 miles from the finish, when partner Shane Barber suffered engine trouble.

In March 2016, Palin was seriously injured in a snowmachine crash, suffering a collapsed lung, fractured ribs, and a broken clavicle and shoulder blade.

Public Safety commissioner controversy

Palin's name has appeared in news reports regarding the firing of commissioner Walt Monegan and the actions of Alaska state trooper Mike Wooten. At one point, Todd Palin brought information prepared by himself and a private investigator to Monegan.

On September 12, 2008, the Alaska legislature subpoenaed Palin to testify on his role in the controversy. On September 18, the McCain/Palin campaign announced that Todd Palin would refuse to testify because he does not believe the investigation is legitimate. State senator Bill Wielechowski said that the witnesses could not be punished for disobeying the subpoenas until the full legislature comes into session, then scheduled to be in January 2009.

On October 10, 2008, Palin was cited in special investigator Stephen Branchflower's report to the Legislative Council. One of Branchflower's four main findings was that the governor had violated Alaska's ethics act when she "wrongfully permitted Todd Palin to use the governor's office ... to continue to contact subordinate state employees in an effort to find some way to get trooper Wooten fired". Todd Palin's conduct was not assessed in the report, as he was not an executive branch employee.

Personal life
In August 1988, Palin eloped with his high-school girlfriend Sarah Heath. The Palins have five children: Track Charles James (b. 1989), who has enlisted in the United States Army and deployed to Iraq on September 11, 2008; Bristol Sheeran Marie (b. 1990); Willow Bianca Faye (b. 1994); Piper Indy Grace (b. 2001); and Trig Paxson Van (b. 2008), who has Down syndrome; they also have seven grandchildren.

Palin fishes and holds a Private Pilot Certificate. He also owns his own aircraft, a Piper PA-18 Super Cub.

Palin's stepmother, Faye Palin, ran unsuccessfully in 2002 for the position of mayor of Wasilla, Alaska, to succeed Palin's wife, who was term-limited. Faye Palin, who is pro-choice and a registered Democrat, lost to Dianne M. Keller, a candidate endorsed by Sarah Palin.

Palin filed for divorce from Sarah on August 29, 2019, citing "incompatibility of temperament". The divorce was finalized on March 23, 2020.

References

External links

 

1964 births
Alaska Independents
Alaskan Independence Party politicians
American fishers
American people of Dutch descent
American people of English descent
American people of Yupik descent
BP people
First Ladies and Gentlemen of Alaska
Living people
Native American sportspeople
Todd
Participants in American reality television series
People from Dillingham Census Area, Alaska
People from Wasilla, Alaska
Racing drivers from Alaska